The Cirrus VK-30 is a single-engine pusher-propeller homebuilt aircraft originally sold as a kit by Cirrus Design (now called Cirrus Aircraft), and was the company's first model, introduced in 1987.

As a kit aircraft, the VK-30 is a relatively obscure design with few completed aircraft flying. Its most important legacy is that the work done on developing and marketing the aircraft convinced the designers, the Klapmeier brothers, that the best way to proceed in the future was with a more conventional layout and with a certified production aircraft. Thus the lessons of the VK-30 were directly responsible for the design of the Cirrus SR20 and SR22, which have been the best-selling general aviation airplanes in the world every year since 2003. The VK-30 also served as a significant inspiration for the creation of the company's latest aircraft, the Cirrus Vision Jet, which in 2018 won the Collier Trophy for becoming the first single-engine personal jet with a whole-plane parachute recovery system.

Design and development

The VK-30 design was conceived in the early 1980s as a kit plane project by three college students, Alan Klapmeier and Jeff Viken from Ripon College in Wisconsin, and Alan's brother, Dale Klapmeier, who was attending the University of Wisconsin–Stevens Point. Jeff Viken's wife, Sally, designed the VK-30's flap system. Together, in the Klapmeiers' parents' barn in rural Sauk County, Wisconsin, they formed Cirrus Design as the company to produce the VK-30 (VK standing for Viken-Klapmeier).

The aircraft has an all-composite construction and was designed to achieve natural laminar flow over the fuselage as well as the wing and tail surfaces to provide for very low drag—using a NASA NLF(1)-0414F airfoil. The prototype incorporated some parts from production aircraft, including the nose gear from a Piper Cherokee and the main landing gear from a Lake LA-4. The VK-30 was designed to be a five-seat aircraft from the start, which made it considerably larger than most other amateur-built aircraft of its day. It incorporated a mid-engine design, driving a three-bladed pusher propeller behind the tail through an extension shaft. The powerplant was a Continental IO-550-G piston engine developing .

The VK-30 was introduced at the 1987 EAA AirVenture Oshkosh convention in Oshkosh, Wisconsin and first flew on 11 February 1988. Kit deliveries commenced shortly thereafter.

In the late 1980s, the Klapmeier brothers approached jet engine manufacturer Williams International about the possibility of installing a small, single Williams FJ44 turbofan engine on the VK-30. The idea never materialized at that time, however, it significantly inspired the original design concept of the Vision Jet in the mid-2000s.

Cirrus discontinued production of the VK-30 towards the end of 1993.

In 1996 the company announced plans to develop a stronger replacement wing for about 28 VK30s supplied to past customers.

Operational history
Cirrus delivered about 40 kits, and built four additional factory prototypes. The company estimated that there were 13 customer VK-30s completed. As of 11 February 2018, four were still registered with the Federal Aviation Administration in the US, although at one time a total of 12 had been registered.

Variants

Cirrus/Israviation ST50 
The VK-30 was the predecessor of the Cirrus ST50, which had an almost-identical configuration to the VK-30, but included a larger ventral fin on the tail of the aircraft, a slightly larger fuselage, and was powered by a Pratt & Whitney Canada PT6-135 turboprop engine in place of the piston engine used in the VK-30. Cirrus designed and initially developed the aircraft under contract to an Israeli aircraft manufacturer named Israviation, and first flew it in Duluth, Minnesota in 1994. Isravation attempted to certify and market the ST50 in the proceeding years but it never entered production by the company.

Accidents
Between 1990 and 2020, seven US-registered VK-30s crashed, with a total of ten fatalities.

On 22 March 1996, retired astronaut Robert F. Overmyer died at age 59 in the crash of an Allison turbine-powered VK-30. He was testing the aircraft for stall recovery characteristics at aft center of gravity limits when the aircraft departed controlled flight.

Aircraft on display

Air Zoo, Portage, Michigan
EAA AirVenture Museum, Oshkosh, Wisconsin
Florida Air Museum, Lakeland, Florida

Specifications (VK-30)

See also

References

External links

"Fast Fourward" - 1990 AOPA Pilot article on the Cirrus VK30 and Klapmeier brothers

VK-30
1980s United States civil utility aircraft
Single-engined pusher aircraft
Mid-engined aircraft
Low-wing aircraft
Homebuilt aircraft
Aircraft first flown in 1988